Tentara Pelajar or Student's Armies, sometimes referred to as Student's Brigades is a collective name used for many small self-organized independent military units formed by students across Indonesia during Indonesian National Revolution. Consisted mostly of very young pemuda (youth) from middle to highschools between age of 14-18, they were famous for being uncontrollable and very radical compared to other more disciplined Republican units and militia. While some units of Tentara Pelajar had centralized command and some degree of control by Indonesian military commanders, many more were simply decentralized militia or units that are formed by students themselves and act independently from the rest of Indonesian armed forces.

References 

Indonesian National Revolution
Military history of Indonesia
Military of Indonesia